Víctor Pérez Alonso (born 12 January 1988) is a Spanish footballer who plays as a defensive midfielder for Andorran club Atlètic Club d'Escaldes.

Club career
Born in Albacete, Castilla–La Mancha, Pérez played his first seasons as a senior in the Community of Madrid, representing amateurs Getafe CF B and AD Alcorcón B. In the 2008–09 season, he competed in the Segunda División B with the latter's first team.

In the summer of 2009, Pérez moved to Segunda División with SD Huesca. He played his first game as a professional on 2 September in a 0–0 away draw against Levante UD in the Copa del Rey, and scored his first league goal on 5 December of that year in the 2–1 home victory over Rayo Vallecano.

Pérez signed for fellow league club Real Valladolid in July 2011, for three years. He appeared in 44 matches in all competitions in his debut campaign, adding seven goals in the process as the Castile and León side returned to La Liga after two years.

Pérez made his debut in the top flight on 20 August 2012, playing the full 90 minutes in a 1–0 win at Real Zaragoza. He scored four goals during the season to help the team rank in 14th position and thus escape relegation, all from penalties.

In the 2014 off-season, following Valladolid's relegation, Pérez renewed his contract for a further three years and was loaned to top-division club Levante until June 2016. On 31 January 2015, however, his loan was cancelled.

On 27 March 2015, Pérez transferred to the Chicago Fire FC on loan until June. He only played two minutes in the Major League Soccer, against Toronto FC, being released subsequently.

Pérez moved to Córdoba CF also in the Spanish second tier in July 2015, in a season-long loan deal. On 19 August 2016, he returned to his former team Alcorcón after agreeing to a one-year loan contract.

On 9 September 2017, Pérez joined Wisła Kraków in the Polish Ekstraklasa. On 2 March of the following year, he moved to the Indian Super League with Bengaluru FC on a short-term deal.

In January 2019, Pérez signed with Lithuanian club FK Žalgiris. He left at the end of the year and, on 12 February 2020, joined I-League club East Bengal Club as a replacement for his compatriot Martí Crespí.

Pérez returned to Spain and its division three in January 2021, with the 33-year-old moving to CD El Ejido. Thirteen months later, he signed for Atlètic Club d'Escaldes in the Andorran Primera Divisió.

Career statistics

References

External links

Sportskeeda profile (archived)

1988 births
Living people
Sportspeople from Albacete
Spanish footballers
Footballers from Castilla–La Mancha
Association football midfielders
La Liga players
Segunda División players
Segunda División B players
Getafe CF B players
AD Alcorcón B players
AD Alcorcón footballers
SD Huesca footballers
Real Valladolid players
Levante UD footballers
Córdoba CF players
CD El Ejido players
Major League Soccer players
Chicago Fire FC players
Ekstraklasa players
Wisła Kraków players
Indian Super League players
I-League players
Bengaluru FC players
East Bengal Club players
A Lyga players
FK Žalgiris players
Primera Divisió players
Atlètic Club d'Escaldes players
Spanish expatriate footballers
Expatriate soccer players in the United States
Expatriate footballers in Poland
Expatriate footballers in India
Expatriate footballers in Lithuania
Expatriate footballers in Andorra
Spanish expatriate sportspeople in the United States
Spanish expatriate sportspeople in Poland
Spanish expatriate sportspeople in India
Spanish expatriate sportspeople in Lithuania
Spanish expatriate sportspeople in Andorra